An oil is any nonpolar chemical substance that is composed primarily of hydrocarbons and is hydrophobic (does not mix with water) & lipophilic (mixes with other oils). Oils are usually flammable and surface active. Most oils are unsaturated lipids that are liquid at room temperature.

The general definition of oil includes classes of chemical compounds that may be otherwise unrelated in structure, properties, and uses. Oils may be animal, vegetable, or petrochemical in origin, and may be volatile or non-volatile. They are used for food (e.g., olive oil), fuel (e.g., heating oil), medical purposes (e.g., mineral oil), lubrication (e.g. motor oil), and the manufacture of many types of paints, plastics, and other materials. Specially prepared oils are used in some religious ceremonies and rituals as purifying agents.

Etymology 

Types

Organic oils 
Organic oils are produced in remarkable diversity by plants, animals, and other organisms through natural metabolic processes. Lipid is the scientific term for the fatty acids, steroids and similar chemicals often found in the oils produced by living things, while oil refers to an overall mixture of chemicals. Organic oils may also contain chemicals other than lipids, including proteins, waxes (class of compounds with oil-like properties that are solid at common temperatures) and alkaloids.

Lipids can be classified by the way that they are made by an organism, their chemical structure and their limited solubility in water compared to oils. They have a high carbon and hydrogen content and are considerably lacking in oxygen compared to other organic compounds and minerals; they tend to be relatively nonpolar molecules, but may include both polar and nonpolar regions as in the case of phospholipids and steroids.

Mineral oils 

Crude oil, or petroleum, and its refined components, collectively termed petrochemicals, are crucial resources in the modern economy. Crude oil originates from ancient fossilized organic materials, such as zooplankton and algae, which geochemical processes convert into oil. The name "mineral oil" is a misnomer, in that minerals are not the source of the oil—ancient plants and animals are. Mineral oil is organic. However, it is classified as "mineral oil" instead of as "organic oil" because its organic origin is remote (and was unknown at the time of its discovery), and because it is obtained in the vicinity of rocks, underground traps, and sands. Mineral oil also refers to several specific distillates of crude oil.

Applications

Cooking 

Several edible vegetable and animal oils, and also fats, are used for various purposes in cooking and food preparation. In particular, many foods are fried in oil much hotter than boiling water. Oils are also used for flavoring and for modifying the texture of foods (e.g. stir fry). Cooking oils are derived either from animal fat, as butter, lard and other types, or plant oils from olive, maize, sunflower and many other species.

Cosmetics 
Oils are applied to hair to give it a lustrous look, to prevent tangles and roughness and to stabilize the hair to promote growth. See hair conditioner.

Religion 
Oil has been used throughout history as a religious medium. It is often considered a spiritually purifying agent and is used for anointing purposes. As a particular example, holy anointing oil has been an important ritual liquid for Judaism and Christianity.

Painting 
 
Color pigments are easily suspended in oil, making it suitable as a supporting medium for paints. The oldest known extant oil paintings date from 650 AD.

Heat transfer 

Oils are used as coolants in oil cooling, for instance in electric transformers. Heat transfer oils are used both as coolants (see oil cooling), for heating (e.g. in oil heaters) and in other applications of heat transfer.

Lubrication 

Given that they are non-polar, oils do not easily adhere to other substances. This makes them useful as lubricants for various engineering purposes. Mineral oils are more commonly used as machine lubricants than biological oils are. Whale oil is preferred for lubricating clocks, because it does not evaporate, leaving dust, although its use was banned in the USA in 1980.

It is a long-running myth that spermaceti from whales has still been used in NASA projects such as the Hubble Space Telescope and the Voyager probe because of its extremely low freezing temperature. Spermaceti is not actually an oil, but a mixture mostly of wax esters, and there is no evidence that NASA has used whale oil.

Fuel 

Some oils burn in liquid or aerosol form, generating light, and heat which can be used directly or converted into other forms of energy such as electricity or mechanical work. In order to obtain many fuel oils, crude oil is pumped from the ground and is shipped via oil tanker or a pipeline to an oil refinery. There, it is converted from crude oil to diesel fuel (petrodiesel), ethane (and other short-chain alkanes), fuel oils (heaviest of commercial fuels, used in ships/furnaces), gasoline (petrol), jet fuel, kerosene, benzene (historically), and liquefied petroleum gas.

In the 18th and 19th centuries, whale oil was commonly used for lamps, which was replaced with natural gas and then electricity.

Chemical feedstock 

Crude oil can be refined into a wide variety of component hydrocarbons. Petrochemicals are the refined components of crude oil and the chemical products made from them. They are used as detergents, fertilizers, medicines, paints, plastics, synthetic fibers, and synthetic rubber.

Organic oils are another important chemical feedstock, especially in green chemistry.

See also 
 Emulsifier, a chemical which allows oil and water to mix

References

External links 

 Petroleum Online e-Learning resource from IHRDC

 
Chemical substances